Chroniques du Pays des Mères is a French language science fiction novel by Élisabeth Vonarburg. It was first published in Canada in 1992 and has been translated in English under the title In the Mothers' Land and later republished in English as The Maerlande Chronicles. It has won the Philip K. Dick Award (special citation) in 1992.

Plot summary
The action takes place several centuries after the events of Le Silence de la Cité. Large areas have been drowned by the rising sea and most of Europe is now a poisoned wasteland. Due to a genetic mutation, women now outnumber men by 70 to 1. The collapsed society described in Le Silence de la Cité has been slowly rebuilt. Post-collapse warlord states have evolved into patriarchal kingdoms - the Harems - before being overthrown by the hives, female-run city-states, every bit as warlike and tyrannical as their male-run predecessors. Those have in turn been replaced by a more peaceful female dominated society organized as a loose federation of local communities.

The novel follows the life of Lisbeï, the daughter of the "mother" of the Betely community, in the province of Litale. Destined to succeed her she grows up with her sister and friend, Tula, her being barren prevents her from doing so. While exploring ruined tunnels she discovers documents which question everything her society thought it knew about its past.

External links

1992 Canadian novels
Novels by Élisabeth Vonarburg
Feminist science fiction novels
1992 science fiction novels
Canadian science fiction novels
Canadian French-language novels